The following is a list of notable events and releases that happened in 2008 in music in South Korea.

Debuting and disbanded in 2008

Debuting groups

2AM
2PM
Davichi
Guckkasten
Ibadi
Mighty Mouth
Miss S
Shinee
Super Junior-H
U-KISS
Untouchable

Solo debuts

Ajoo
Alex Chu
Boram
Bizzy
IU
Joo
Jungyup
Lee Young-yoo
Park Sae-byul
Solji

Disbanded groups
The Jadu
Sanulrim
Stony Skunk
Turtles

Releases in 2008

First quarter

January

February

March

Second quarter

April

May

June

Third quarter

July

August

September

Fourth quarter

October

November

December

See also
2008 in South Korea
List of South Korean films of 2008

 
South Korean music
K-pop